The 2017–18 BYU Cougars men's basketball team represented Brigham Young University in the 2017–18 NCAA Division I men's basketball season. It was head coach Dave Rose's 13th season at BYU and the Cougars seventh season as members of the West Coast Conference. The Cougars played their home games at the Marriott Center in Provo, Utah. They finished the season 24–11, 11–7 in West Coast Conference play to finish in third place. As the No. 3 seed in the WCC tournament, they defeated San Diego in the quarterfinals and Saint Mary's in the semifinals before losing to Gonzaga in the championship game. They received an at-large bid to the National Invitation Tournament where they were defeated by Stanford in the first round.

Previous season 
The Cougars finished the 2016–17 season 22–12, 12–6 in WCC play to finish in third place. They defeated Loyola Marymount in the quarterfinals of the WCC tournament to advance to the semifinals where they lost to Saint Mary's. They received an invitation to the National Invitation Tournament where they lost in the first round to Texas–Arlington.

Offseason

Departures

Incoming transfers

Recruiting class of 2017

Recruiting class of 2018

2017–18 return missionaries
BYU's roster will feature four missionaries for the new season. First up is Zac Seljaas who returns after coming home early for a shoulder injury. 

Up next Ryan Andrus and Dalton Nixon return. 

Rounding out the group of four was Luke Worthington.

2017–18 media

Nu Skin BYU Sports Network

BYU Radio- Flagship Station, Nationwide (Dish Network 980, Sirius XM 143, and byuradio.org)
KSL 102.7 FM and 1160 AM- (Salt Lake City/ Provo, UT and ksl.com)
KTHK- Blackfoot/ Idaho Falls/ Pocatello/ Rexburg, ID
KMGR- Manti, UT
KSUB- Cedar City, UT
KDXU- St. George, UT
Play-by-Play: Greg Wrubell or Jason Shepherd
Analysts: Mark Durrant or Terry Nashiff
Studio Hosts: Jason Shepherd or Ben Bagley

Roster

 Nick Emery (G- #4) was originally part of the roster. However a combination of an NCAA investigation and an off-season divorce caused him to withdraw from school for the 2017–18 season.

Schedule and results
The 2017–18 non-conferesnce schedule was announced on July 11, 2017. Highlights on the schedule include a trip to defending Ivy League champions Princeton, a rematch with UT Arlington (who ended BYU's season in 2016–17), Barclay's Center Classic matches against Alabama and UMass, and four in-state opponents in Utah Valley, Utah State, Weber State (as part of the inaugural Beehive Classic), and Utah.

|-
!colspan=11 style=| Exhibition

|-
!colspan=11 style=| Non-Conference Regular Season

|-
!colspan=11 style=| WCC regular season

|-
!colspan=11 style=| WCC tournament

|-
!colspan=11 style=| NIT

Game summaries

Cougar Tipoff
Broadcasters: Spencer Linton & Jarom Jordan
Starting Lineups: 
BYU Blue: Zac Seljaas, Elijah Bryant, Nick Emery, Yoeli Childs, TJ Haws
BYU White: Jahshire Hardnett, Rylan Bergensen, Kajon Brown, Dalton Nixon, Luke Worthington

Exhibition: New Mexico
Broadcasters: Jeff Siembieda & Hunter Greene (New Mexico Radio Network exclusive)
Starting Lineups:
BYU: Elijah Bryant, Nick Emery, Yoeli Childs, TJ Haws, Luke Worthington
New Mexico: Chris McNeal, Sam Logwood, Joe Furstinger, Dane Kuiper, Troy Simons

Exhibition: Westminster
Broadcasters: Dave McCann, Blaine Fowler, & Spencer Linton
Starting Lineups: 
Westminster: Sam Orchard, Dayon Goodman, Quincy Bair, Jarred Laws, Scott Cook
BYU : Elijah Bryant, Nick Emery, Yoeli Childs, TJ Haws, Luke Worthington

Exhibition: Colorado College
Broadcasters: Dave McCann, Blaine Fowler, & Spencer Linton
Starting Lineups:
Colorado College: Eric Houska, Bobby Roth, CooXioEli Black, Ryan Young, Chris Martin
BYU: Zac Seljaas, Elijah Bryant, Yoeli Childs, TJ Haws, Luke Worthington

Mississippi Valley State
Broadcasters: Dave McCann, Blaine Fowler, & Spencer Linton
Series History: BYU leads 2–0
Starting Lineups: 
MVSU: Dante Scott, Jordan Evans, Tereke Eckwood, Arinze Anakwenze, Jaal Watson
BYU: Zac Seljaas, Elijah Bryant, Yoeli Childs, TJ Haws, Luke Worthington

Princeton
Broadcasters: Derek Jones & Noah Savage
Series History: BYU leads 5–0
Starting Lineups:
BYU: Zac Seljaas, Elijah Bryant, Yoeli Childs, TJ Haws, Luke Worthington
Princeton: Devin Cannady, Amir Bell, Myles Stephens, Ryan Schwieger, Alec Brennan

UT Arlington
Broadcasters: Dave McCann, Blaine Fowler, & Spencer Linton
Series History: Series even 1–1
Starting Lineups: 
UT Arlington: Erick Neal, Nathan Hawkins, Kaelon Wilson, Johnny Hamilton, Kevin Hervey
BYU: Zac Seljaas, Elijah Bryant, Yoeli Childs, TJ Haws, Luke Worthington

Niagara
Broadcasters: Dave McCann, Blaine Fowler, & Spencer Linton
Series History: BYU leads 5–2
Starting Lineups:
Niagara: Chris Barton, Kahlil Dukes, Marvin Prochet, Matt Scott, Dominic Robb
BYU: Jahshire Hardnett, Zac Seljaas, Yoeli Childs, TJ Haws, Luke Worthington

Alabama
Broadcasters: Chris Hassel, Tim Doyle, & Kristen Balboni
Series History: Alabama leads 1–0
Starting Lineups: 
BYU: Jahshire Hardnett, Elijah Bryant, Yoeli Childs, TJ Haws, Luke Worthington
Alabama: Donta Hall, Collin Sexton, Daniel Giddens, Dazon Ingram, John Petty

UMass
Broadcasters: Chris Hassel, Tim Doyle, & Kristen Balboni
Series History: BYU leads 5–0
Starting Lineups:
BYU: Jahshire Hardnett, Elijah Bryant, Yoeli Childs, TJ Haws, Luke Worthington
UMass: Malik Hines, Luwane Pipkins, C.J. Anderson, Rayshawn Miller, Rashaan Holloway

References

2017-18 team
BYU
2017 in sports in Utah
2018 in sports in Utah
BYU